Gozokht (also Romanized as Gazokht and Kozokht; also known as Qalat Gujat) is a village in Zirkuh Rural District, Central District, Zirkuh County, South Khorasan Province, Iran. At the 2006 census, its population was 699, in 135 families.
And in 2011 the population of this village was 828 people (in 207 families)

References 

Populated places in Zirkuh County